King George Island may refer to:

 King George Island (South Shetland Islands), Antarctica
 King George Island (Tasmania), Australia
 King George Islands, Polynesia
 King George Islands (Canada), part of the Belcher Islands
 King George III Archipelago, a name used for the Alexander Archipelago in the 19th century

See also
 George Island (disambiguation)

ka:ჯორჯის კუნძული (მრავალმნიშვნელოვანი)